Ralph Young (born May 4, 1946) is a former American football coach.  He served as the head football coach at Southwest Minnesota State College—now known as Southwest Minnesota State University—from 1971 to 1972, at Illinois Benedictine College—now known as Benedictine University—from 1979 to 1983, at William Penn College in 1993, at Westminster College in Fulton, Missouri from 1996 to 1998, and at Oklahoma Panhandle State University from 1999 to 2001, compiling a career college football coaching record of 44–96.  Young was also the head baseball coach at the University of South Dakota for one season, in 1971, tallying a mark of 5–23.

Early life
Young was born in Clearwater, Florida. He went to Parsons College in Fairfield, Iowa, and played as a linebacker for the Parsons Wildcats  under coach Marcelino Huerta.

Head coaching record

College football

References

1946 births
Living people
Benedictine Eagles football coaches
Oklahoma Panhandle State Aggies football coaches
Parsons Wildcats football players
South Dakota Coyotes baseball coaches
South Dakota Coyotes football coaches
Southeast Missouri State Redhawks football coaches
Southern Illinois Salukis football coaches
Southwest Minnesota State Mustangs football coaches
Westminster Blue Jays football coaches
William Penn Statesmen football coaches
Sportspeople from Clearwater, Florida